Predporozhnyy is an abandoned settlement in Oymyakonsky District, Sakha Republic, Russia. It has also been referred to as Yubileynyy, the name of the local gold mine. It rose to the status of an urban-type settlement in 1964.

Geography 
Predporozhnyy is located in the extreme north of Oymyakonsky District, at the convergence of two branches of the Indigirka River. It is approximately 747 km from Yakutsk, and approximately 5,217 km from Moscow.

History 
Predporozhnyy was founded in the 1950s after the discovery of gold deposits in the area. It was classified as an urban-type settlement in 1961. The settlement was abolished in 2007.

Climate 
The climate of Predporozhnyy can be classified as subarctic, or Dwc under the Köppen climate classification.

References 

Former populated places in the Sakha Republic
1964 establishments in the Soviet Union